Robert Dean (born February 14, 1954) is a politician from the state of Michigan. He is a former member of the Michigan House of Representatives. His district was in the eastern portion of the city of Grand Rapids. He is a Democrat.

Early life
Dean graduated from Grand Rapids Central High School in 1972. Dean worked for Interstate Brands Corporation in Grand Rapids, where he also was an American Federation of Labor and Congress of Industrial Organizations union member for nine years. In 1990 he was elected to the Grand Rapids Public School Board, where he served until 1997.

In 1999, Dean was elected City Commissioner where he served until 2006, when he resigned to run for the State House.

Political career
Dean filed to run for the 75th district in early 2006. Popular Rep. Jerry Kooiman did not run for re-election due to term-limits. Dean had little primary opposition. In the general election, Dean faced off against Republican Tim Doyle. It was one of the most closely watched races in Michigan. Dean won by only 1,500 votes. In the House, Dean sat on the Commerce, Education, Families and Children's Services, and Military and Veterans Affairs and Homeland Security Committees.

He unsuccessfully ran in the 2015 Grand Rapids mayoral election.

Personal
In 1980, Dean founded the New Life Church of God in Christ, and has been its Pastor for the past 30 years. Dean has been married to Betty Dean for 35 years and has two children and five grandchildren.

External links
 Robert Deans official House Democrats Website
 Robert Dean's Campaign Website

Living people
Members of the Michigan House of Representatives
African-American state legislators in Michigan
1954 births
Politicians from Grand Rapids, Michigan
21st-century African-American people
20th-century African-American people